Anne Hollingshead Francine (August 8, 1917 – December 3, 1999) was an American actress and cabaret singer.

Biography
Francine was born in Atlantic City, New Jersey to Philadelphia socialite parents Albert and Emilie Francine. She was raised on the Main Line region of suburban Philadelphia. She won an amateur singing contest and began performing as a cabaret singer in the 1930s at the Coq Rouge. Other notable engagements included the Copacabana and the Algonquin. She sang abroad in London and Paris in the 1940s. Her signature songs were The Lamp is Low and Raggedy Ann.

She made her Broadway debut in 1954 with Shirley Booth in By the Beautiful Sea. She stepped in for Bea Arthur as Vera Charles in the 1966 Broadway production of Mame, starring Angela Lansbury. She and Lansbury reprised their characters in the 1983 revival. She last appeared on Broadway in 1987 as Mrs. Harcourt in the Lincoln Center revival of Anything Goes, starring Patti LuPone.

She portrayed the role as villain Flora Simpson Reilly in the American television series Harper Valley PTA.

In 1979, she starred as the Evil Queen in the musical adaption of the 1937 animated film Snow White and the Seven Dwarfs.

Her film work included Fellini's Juliet of the Spirits (1965), Stand Up and Be Counted (1972), Savages (1972), and Crocodile Dundee (1986).

She taught cabaret singers at the Eugene O'Neill Theatre Center in Waterford, Connecticut even after losing her ability to speak after a stroke in 1992.

She died in a Connecticut hospital on December 3, 1999, after suffering a stroke and was interred in the Michael Ehret mausoleum on "Millionaire's Row" at Laurel Hill Cemetery in Philadelphia.

Filmography

References

External links

The New York Public Library Digital Collections - Anne Francine

1917 births
1999 deaths
20th-century American actresses
20th-century American singers
20th-century American women singers
Actresses from Philadelphia
American film actresses
American stage actresses
American television actresses
Burials at Laurel Hill Cemetery (Philadelphia)
Cabaret singers
Musicians from Atlantic City, New Jersey
Musicians from Philadelphia